Craig Fulton (born 6 November 1974) is a former South Africa men's field hockey international and a former coach of the Ireland men's national field hockey team. As a player he represented South Africa at the 1996 and 2004 Summer Olympics and at the 2002 Men's Hockey World Cup. His brother, Grant, and his wife, Natalie, were also South Africa field hockey internationals. In 2004 Fulton and his wife became the first married couple to represent South Africa at the same Olympic Games.

As a player/coach with Pembroke Wanderers he won two Irish Senior Cups, two Men's Irish Hockey League titles and the EuroHockey Club Trophy. As a coach Fulton guided Ireland to third place at the 2015 Men's EuroHockey Nations Championship and to qualification for both the 2016 Summer Olympics and the 2018 Men's Hockey World Cup. While coaching Ireland, Fulton was named the 2015 FIH Men's Coach of the Year. He was assistant coach of the Belgium team that won the 2018 Men's Hockey World Cup.

Early years and education
Fulton was educated at Pretoria Boys High School and Stellenbosch University.

Domestic teams

Chelmsford
Between 1999 and 2005 Fulton served as player/coach of Chelmsford in the Men's England Hockey League. In September 2002, while in Pretoria, Fulton was hospitalised after he and his then girlfriend and later wife Natalie, interrupted a suspected burglar at his home. Fulton was reportedly stabbed or slashed seven times during the incident. In 2004 he guided Chelmsford to promotion to the Premier Division. During this time Fulton also coached field hockey at Felsted School.

Pembroke Wanderers
In 2005 Fulton was appointed director of coaching and player/coach to the senior men's team at Pembroke Wanderers. With a team that included David and Conor Harte, Ronan Gormley, Stuart Loughrey, Justin Sheriff, Alan Sothern and Ian Symons, Fulton subsequently guided Wanderers to five national titles in four seasons. These included the 2006 All-Ireland Men's Club Championship, two Irish Senior Cup wins in 2008  and 2009  and to two Men's Irish Hockey League titles in 2008–09  and 2009–10.  They also won the 2009 EuroHockey Club Trophy.

South Africa international
Fulton represented South Africa at the 1996 and 2004 Summer Olympics and at the 2002 Men's Hockey World Cup. His brother, Grant, and his wife, Natalie, were also South Africa field hockey internationals. The brothers were team mates at the 1996 Olympics. In 2004 Fulton and his wife became the first married couple to represent South Africa at the same Olympic Games.

Coach

South Africa
Between 2011 and 2014, after returning to South Africa, Fulton held several coaching positions including serving as Assistant Coach of both the women's (2011) and men's (2013–2014) national teams. He also coached the Northern Blues at interprovincial level and served as technical director with the University of Pretoria while his wife, Natalie, served as the club manager.

Ireland
Between 2006 and 2009, in addition to being player/coach at Pembroke Wanderers, Fulton also served as Assistant Coach of the Ireland men's national field hockey team, first to Dave Passmore and then to Paul Revington. In 2014 he succeeded Andrew Meredith as the senior Ireland coach. Fulton subsequently guided Ireland to third place at the 2015 Men's EuroHockey Nations Championship, to World League Round 2 tournament wins in 2015 and 2017 and to qualification for both the 2016 Summer Olympics and the 2018 Men's Hockey World Cup. While coaching Ireland, Fulton was also named the 2015 FIH Men's Coach of the Year. In May 2018 he resigned as Ireland coach after accepting an offer to become Belgium's assistant coach.

Belgium
In May 2018 Fulton was appointed Assistant Coach of the Belgium men's national field hockey team. He was assistant coach when Belgium won the 2018 Men's Hockey World Cup and  Field hockey at the 2020 Summer Olympics.

Honours

Player
South Africa
Hockey Africa Cup of Nations
Winners: 1996, 2000: 2 
Men's Hockey Champions Challenge
Runners up: 2001: 1

Player/coach
Pembroke Wanderers
EuroHockey Club Trophy
Winners: 2009: 1 
Men's Irish Hockey League
Winners: 2008–09, 2009–10: 2
Irish Senior Cup
Winners: 2008, 2009: 2
All-Ireland Men's Club Championship
Winners: 2006: 1

Coach
Ireland
Hamburg Masters
Winners: 2017 
Men's FIH Hockey World League Round 2
Winners: 2015 San Diego, 2017 Belfast
Men's Hockey Investec Cup
Runners up: 2014
Individual
FIH Men's Coach of the Year
Winner: 2015

References

External links

1974 births
Living people
South African male field hockey players
South African field hockey coaches
Olympic field hockey players of South Africa
Field hockey players at the 1996 Summer Olympics
Field hockey players at the 2004 Summer Olympics
2002 Men's Hockey World Cup players
Field hockey players at the 1998 Commonwealth Games
Field hockey players at the 2002 Commonwealth Games
Commonwealth Games competitors for South Africa
Pembroke Wanderers Hockey Club players
Men's Irish Hockey League players
Men's England Hockey League players
South African expatriate sportspeople in Ireland
South African expatriate sportspeople in England
Sportspeople from Pretoria
Stellenbosch University alumni
Expatriate field hockey players
Ireland men's national field hockey team coaches